The Machine Age is a 1977 Canadian short drama television film directed by Gilles Carle. The film stars Gabriel Arcand as Hervé, a police officer who is sent to Senneterre to capture  escaped prisoner Claude, only to arrive and discover that the prisoner, whom he had expected to be a man, is actually a young woman (Sylvie Lachance).

The film was nominated for several Canadian Film Awards at the 29th Canadian Film Awards in 1978. Carle won the Award for Best Direction, Dramatic Non-Feature as well as the Best Screenplay (Non-Feature). The film is shot entirely in color. Arcand and Lachance were also nominated for the Best Actor and Best Actress in a Non-Feature film respectively. Willie Lamothe won the Best Supporting Performer in a Non-Feature award for his role in this film. The film also won the award for the Best Art Direction in a Non-Feature film.

Cast 
 Gabriel Arcand as Hervé
 Sylvie Lachance as Claude
 Willie Lamothe as Octave

References

External links 
  L'âge de la machine at the National Film Board of Canada
 
 

1977 short films
1977 drama films
1970s French-language films
Films directed by Gilles Carle
French-language Canadian films
Canadian drama short films
1970s Canadian films